Jack Mills (1905–1970) was the train driver in the Great Train Robbery.

Jack Mills may also refer to:

Jack Mills (art director), American set decorator
Jack Mills (Australian footballer) (1930–2001), Australian rules footballer
Jack Mills (baseball) (1889–1973), Major League Baseball third baseman
Jack Mills (basketball) (1918–2007), American professional basketball player
Jack Mills (classification researcher) (1918–2010), British librarian and classification researcher
Jack Mills (English footballer) (born 1992), English soccer player
Jack Mills, co-founder and co-owner (with his brother Irving Mills) of Mills Music, a music publisher founded in the 1920s
John Mills (New Zealand cricketer) (1905–1972), New Zealand test cricketer sometimes known as Jack Mills

See also
John Mills (disambiguation)